AlphaMax Academy is a private international school established on September 1, 1998, in the Republic of Suriname. The school is run by the Directors of the AlphaMax Foundation.

History
The academy, which is registered in the Republic of Suriname and recognized by the Suriname Ministry of Education, was started in 1998 by a group of academics in Suriname.

In 2002, the AlphaMax Academy and Foundation, in collaboration and partnership with TVE (Television for the Environment (London, United Kingdom), the WWF (World Wildlife Fund Guianas), the University of Suriname, the University of Guyana, and 12 participating primary and secondary institutions in two countries, initiated the Environmental Awareness Program. In addition to field activities, the youth environmental awareness program features a Foundation-guided television series which is viewed in thousands of households in Suriname and Guyana.

In 2007, began offering the Global Assessment Certificate, a Grade 13 program.

Academics
The academic program, delivered in English, includes students from kindergarten through high school (K-13).  It is one of five private international schools delivering courses in English. The academy emphasizes the cultivation and acquisition of sound, classical, foundational knowledge and learning skills, both language-based and quantitative.

The academy utilizes the standard American grades of A, B, C, D & F based on a 4.0 system where A is excellent, B is good, C is average, D is poor, and F signifies failure. Two diplomas are offered:  the higher one, which is called the Diploma of Academic Excellence, is reflective of the graduate's successful completion of Advanced Placement (VWO-level) requirements. The second diploma, the Certificate of General Proficiency, is granted to students who attain the General Equivalency Diploma (HAVO) level of education.

High school students at the academy, pursuing the Diploma of Academic Excellence, are invited to choose a stream of study based on their career interest or choice. Studies include business, science, humanities, and architecture. There is a General Studies stream for students who are undecided or have not determined a specific career choice.

References

Schools in Suriname
International schools in North America
Educational institutions established in 1998
1998 establishments in Suriname